Lawkananda Wildlife Sanctuary is a protected area in Myanmar's Mandalay Region, covering an area of  and ranging in elevation from . It borders the  Irrawaddy river close to Bagan and was established in 1995.

History
Lawkananda Wildlife Sanctuary was established in 1995 for the conservation of dry forest. It is managed by a warden, rangers and foresters, who patrol the area and implement measures to protect the forest against floods and fire.
In 2014, about 56,000 people visited the sanctuary.

Biodiversity

Flora
In 2015, 80 tree species, 160 species of medicinal plants, four bamboo species and 32 species of flowering plants were identified in Lawkananda Wildlife Sanctuary.
The forest type is dry deciduous forest. The tree species include Teak (Tectona grandis), Pterocarpus macrocarpus, Xylia dolabriformis, and Shorea siamensis.

Fauna
Lawkananda Wildlife Sanctuary harbours sambar deer (Cervus unicolor), Indian muntjac (Muntiacus muntjak), Indian hog deer (Hyelaphus porcinus), Eld's deer (Panolia eldii) and Burmese star tortoise (Geochelone platynota).

Threats
Lawkananda Wildlife Sanctuary's habitat is threatened by illicit logging, hunting and fishing of wildlife, fires during the dry season, extraction of water, fuel wood, grass and non-timber forest products.

References

Protected areas of Myanmar
Protected areas established in 1995